The German Wood Workers' Union (DHV) was a trade union representing carpenters, joiners, and related workers, in Germany.

The union was founded in April 1893, at a meeting in Kassel.  The meeting merged the German Carpenters' Union, the German Union of Joiners, and the Union of German Wheelwrights, the Union of Woodturners in Germany, and the Central Union of Workers in the Sweep and Brush Industry in Germany.  It initially had 23,774 members, but grew rapidly, absorbing the union of basket makers in 1896, the machine and cork workers in 1899, the Union of Gilders in 1906, the German Umbrella Makers' Union in 1910 and the Central Union of Carvers in 1919.  That year, it was a founding affiliate of the General German Trade Union Confederation.

In 1922, membership peaked, at 434,843.  By this point, the union was divided into 15 districts, each with two full-time leaders.  It then fell slightly, but was still 315,155 in 1929.  By this time, it represented members in the following trades:

In 1933, the union was banned by the Nazis.

Presidents 
1893: Karl Kloß
1908: Theodor Leipart
1919: Adam Neumann
1920: Fritz Tarnow

References

Carpenters' trade unions
Trade unions established in 1893
Trade unions disestablished in 1933
Trade unions in Germany